Kent Robert Williams (born 1962) is an American painter and graphic novel artist.

Williams, a draftsman and painter, has realized his work through various other artistic channels as well; that of the illustrated word and the graphic novel (including The Fountain with filmmaker Darren Aronofsky), printmaking, photography, design, architecture, and film. A selection of his works on paper, Kent Williams: Drawings & Monotypes, was published in 1991, and Koan: Paintings by Jon J Muth & Kent Williams, was published in 2001. His monograph, Kent Williams, Amalgam: Paintings & Drawings, 1992-2007, with text by Edward Lucie-Smith and Julia Morton, is the most comprehensive collection of Williams' work to date.

Early life 
Williams was born in New Bern, North Carolina. He attended the Pratt Institute in New York City and graduated in 1984.

Comics 
From 1983 to 1985, Kent Williams was a regular contributor to Marvel Comics' Epic Illustrated. He collaborated with writer J. M. DeMatteis on Blood: A Tale in 1987 and with writers Walt and Louise Simonson and co-artist Jon J Muth on Havok and Wolverine: Meltdown the following year. The latter series was a result of Williams and Muth's desire to work on a project together. Williams was the regular cover artist for DC Comics' Hellblazer in 1990–1991. Comics historian Les Daniels noted that Williams' "impressionistic painting style is an example of the new look that DC's Vertigo line brought to comics." Williams drew the "Fear of Falling" short story for Vertigo Preview #1 (1993) which featured the Sandman and was written by Neil Gaiman. In 2006 he illustrated a graphic novel adaptation of The Fountain from the script by filmmaker Darren Aronofsky.

Teaching 
Kent Williams was a visiting instructor at the Pratt Institute, and has taught at the California College of the Arts, San Francisco; East Carolina University, Greenville, North Carolina, and the California Institute of the Arts (CalArts), Valencia, California. Williams lives in Los Angeles and teaches painting at the Art Center College of Design in Pasadena, California. In addition, he is an MFA mentor faculty at the Laguna College of Art and Design.

Personal life 
He is currently living and working in Los Angeles with his partner Soey Milk.

Exhibitions 
His work has been the subject of a number of solo exhibitions including shows in New York City; San Francisco; Sundance, Utah; the Nasher Museum of Art, Durham, North Carolina; in Santa Fe, New Mexico, where he is represented by Evoke Contemporary Gallery; and in Los Angeles, where he is represented by The Merry Karnowsky Gallery. His painting Trace Double-Portrait was exhibited at the National Portrait Gallery in Washington, D.C., as part of the Outwin Boochever 2006 Portrait Exhibition.

Awards 
In 2001, he was invited to be a fellow at the Sundance Filmmakers Lab in Sundance, Utah.

Comics bibliography

Byron Preiss Visual Publications
 The Ray Bradbury Chronicles #1 (1992)

Darkstorm Productions
 Darkstorm #1, 2 (1982)

DC Comics
 
 Batman Black and White #2 (1996)
 Sandman Special #1 (one page) (1991)
 Tell Me, Dark GN (1992)

Paradox Press
 The Big Book Of Urban Legends (1994)

Piranha Press
 Prince: Alter Ego #1 (1991)

Vertigo
 Death Gallery #1 (one page) (1994)
 Destiny: A Chronicle of Deaths Foretold #1–3 (1996)
 Fight for Tomorrow #1–6 (2002–2003)
 Flinch #4 (1999)
 The Fountain GN (2005)
 Shade, the Changing Man vol. 2 #50 (one page) (1994)
 Vertigo Preview #1 (1993)
 Vertigo: Winter's Edge #2 (1999)

Eclipse Comics
 Eclipse Magazine #3, 7 (1981–1982)
 Sabre #7, 8 (1983)

Last Gasp
 Strip AIDS U.S.A. (1988)

Marvel Comics
 
 The Brotherhood #1–3, 7–9 (2001–2002)
 Marvel Fanfare #40 (one page) (1988)
 Uncanny X-Men #252 (1989)
 Wolverine: Killing (1993)

Epic Comics
 A1 vol. 2 #3 (1992)
 Blood: A Tale #1–4 (1987)
 Clive Barker's Book of the Damned: A Hellraiser Companion #4 (1993)
 Clive Barker's Hellraiser #1, 4 (1989–1990)
 Epic Illustrated #19, 29, 33 (1983–1985)
 Havok & Wolverine - Meltdown #1–4 (1988–1989)
 Shadowline Saga: Critical Mass #3 (1990)

New Media Publishing
 The Comic Times, Media Showcase #7 (1981)

Pacific Comics
 Captain Victory and the Galactic Rangers #12 (backup story) (1983)

References

External links
 
 
 
 
 

1962 births
20th-century American artists
21st-century American artists
American comics artists
American contemporary painters
Art Center College of Design faculty
American art educators
DC Comics people
East Carolina University people
Living people
Marvel Comics people
People from New Bern, North Carolina
Pratt Institute alumni